Contortion is an act of twisting and deforming. Contortion may also refer to:
 Contortion, a performance art
 Contorsion, a concept in differential geometry described by the Contorsion tensor
 an old term for complicated geological folds

Contortions may also refer to:
 James Chance and the Contortions, a musical group

Contort may additionally refer to:
 Contort (law), an informal legal term combining "contract" and "tort"
 Contort, a botanical term for a type of aestivation

See also 
 Contortion Spur, a glacier spur in Antarctica